Boonyarit Keattikun (born 5 October 1995 in Nakhon Nayok, Thailand) is a Thai former professional snooker player.

Career
In 2015 Keattikun entered the World Under-21 Snooker Championships in Bucharest as the number 1 seed. Keattikun went on to reach the final and defeated Jamie Clarke 8–7 to win the championship. As a result, he was given a two-year card on the professional World Snooker Tour for the 2016–17 and 2017–18 seasons.
He lost his first eight matches of the 2016/17 season, before beating Scott Donaldson 5–3 in German Masters qualifying. Keattikun lost 5–3 to Anthony Hamilton in the next round. His only other victory this year was at the Welsh Open, where he defeated 1997 world champion Ken Doherty 4–1, before losing by a reversal of this scoreline to Mark Allen.

Performance and rankings timeline

Career finals

Pro-am finals: 1 (1 title)

Amateur finals: 1 (1 title)

References

External links
Boonyarit Keattikun at CueTracker.net: Snooker Results and Statistic Database

Boonyarit Keattikun
Living people
1995 births
Boonyarit Keattikun